The Megapolis Tower 1 (also commonly known as the Hard Rock Hotel) is a skyscraper that is located in the area of Avenida Balboa in Panama City, Panama. Construction began in 2008 and ended in 2011, is 230 meters high and has 63 floors. It was administered by Decameron Hotel Group. This hotel came with complimentary wireless internet and a luxurious spa area. In 2020, the hotel closed due to decreased tourism demand from the COVID-19 pandemic.

See also 
 List of tallest buildings in Panama City

References

Residential buildings completed in 2011
Skyscrapers in Panama City
Skyscraper hotels